The Battle of Kumeyky was fought during the Pavlyuk Uprising between the Polish crown forces and insurgent Cossacks on December 16, 1637. The Polish crown army under the command of Mikołaj Potocki defeated Cossacks commanded by Pavlo Pavliuk.

References

  Marcin Gawęda, Powstanie kozackie 1637, Inforteditions, Zabrze 2007, 

Kumeyki
1637 in Europe
Kumeyki
Kumeyki
History of Cherkasy Oblast